Pakistan competed at the 1956 Summer Olympics in Melbourne, Australia. 55 competitors, all men, took part in 43 events in 8 sports. They won their first medal at this level, winning the silver in the men's field hockey competition.

Medalists
Silver medal in the men's field hockey team competition

Athletics

Men's 100 metres

 Abdul Khaliq
 Heat 3 1st round; 10.8 (→ advanced to 2nd round)
 Heat 2 2nd round; 10.5 (→ advanced to semifinals)
 Semifinal 1; 10.6 (→ did not advance)

 Ghulam Raziq
 Heat 10 1st round; 11.2 (→ did not advance)

 Mohammad Sharif Butt
 Heat 11 1st round; 11.1 (→ did not advance)

Men's 200 metres

 Mohammad Sharif Butt
 Heat 4 1st round; 22.2 (→ did not advance)

 Abdul Khaliq
 Heat 5 1st round; 21.1 (→ advanced to 2nd round)
 Heat 1 2nd round; 21.1 (→ advanced to semifinals)
 Semifinal 1; 21.5 (→ did not advance)

 Abdul Aziz
 Heat 9 1st round; 22.9 (→ did not advance)

Men's 400 metres

 Abdullah Khan
 Heat 1 1st round; 49.0 (→ did not advance)

Men's 800 metres

 Abdullah Khan
 Heat 4 1st round; 1:52.6 (→ did not advance)

 Mahmood Jan
 Heat 5 1st round; 1:59.5 (→ did not advance)

Men's 1,500 metres

 Mahmood Jan
 Heat 2 1st round; 4:15.0 (→ did not advance)

Men's marathon

 Havildar Mohammad Aslam
 2:44.33 finished 22nd out of 33

 Abdul Rashid
 2:57.47 finished 30th out of 33

Men's 110 metres hurdles

 Ghulam Raziq
 Heat 1 1st round; 14.5 (→ advanced to semifinals)
 Semifinal 2; 14.6 (→ did not advance)

 Khawaja Kalim Ghani
 Heat 2 1st round; 16.1 (→ did not advance)

Men's 400 metres hurdles

 Khawaja Kalim Ghani
 Heat 2 1st round; 55.1 (→ did not advance)

 Muhammad Yaqub
 Heat 3 1st round; 53.1 (→ did not advance)

Men's 4x100 metres relay

 Abdul Aziz, Mohammad Sharif Butt, Abdul Khaliq and Ghulam Raziq
 Heat 1 1st round; 41.3 (→ advanced to semifinals)
 Semifinal 2; 40.8 (→ did not advance)

Men's long jump

 Mohammad Rashid
 Failed to qualify for final

 Muhammad Ramzan Ali
 Failed to qualify for final

Men's pole vault

 Allah Ditta
 Failed to qualify for final

Men's hop, step and jump

 Mohammad Rashid
 Failed to qualify for final

 Muhammad Ramzan Ali
 Failed to qualify for final

Men's throwing the discus

 Mohammad Ayub
 Failed to qualify for final

Men's throwing the javelin

 Mohammad Nawaz
 62.55m finished 14th out of 21

 Jalal Khan
 Failed to qualify for final

Men's throwing the hammer

 Mohammad Iqbal
 56.97m finished 11th out of 14

Boxing

Men's flyweight (up to 51 kg)

 Samuel Harris
 1st round; Lost to T Spinks (GB/NI) on pts

Men's bantamweight (up to 54 kg)

 Rashid Ahmed
 1st round; Bye
 2nd round; Lost to M Sitri (ITA) on pts

Men's featherweight (up to 57 kg)

 Maurice White
 1st round; Bye
 2nd round; Lost to TO Falfan (ARG) TKO

Men's light welterweight (up to 63.5 kg)

 Rehmat Gul
 1st round; Lost to F Nenci (ITA) TKO

Men's welterweight (up to 67 kg)

 Bait Hussain
 1st round; Lost to A Dori (HUN) on pts

Men's light middleweight (up to 71 kg)

 Mohammad Safdar
 1st round; Lost to BG Nikolov (BUL) on pts

Cycling

Sprint

 Shahzada Shahrukh 
 Heat 2 1st round (→ sent to repechage)
 Repechage heat 1; finished 14th overall
 
Time trial

 Saleem Mahmood Farooqi
 1:20.8 finished 18th out of 19

Team pursuit

 Shahzada Shahrukh, Saleem Mahmood Farooqi, Mohammad Naqi Malik and Meraj Din
 Heat 1; Lost to Colombia. Finished 12th overall

Individual road race

 Shahzada Shahrukh, Saleem Mahmood Farooqi, Mohammad Naqi Malik and Meraj Din
 All retired

Shahzada Shahrukh, now in his new role as a cyclist, was Pakistan vice-captain of the men's hockey team at the London Olympic Games in 1948

Hockey

Men's Team Competition

Preliminary round Group C

 Defeated  (2-0)
 Defeated  (5-1)

Semifinals

 Defeated  (3-2)

Final

Pakistan won the silver medal

Team Roster

 Abdul Hamid (captain)
 Latifur Rehman (vice-captain)
 Qazi Abdul Waheed (gk)
 Zakir Hussain (gk)
 Munir Dar
 Manzoor Hussain Atif
 Akhtar Hussain
 Ghulam Rasool
 Anwar Ahmed Khan
 Habib Ali Kiddie
 Qazi Musarrat Hussain
 Aziz Naik
 Noor Alam
 Zafar Ali Khan
 Habibur Rehman
 Motiullah
 Mohammad Amin
 Naseer Bunda

Vice-captain Latifur Rehman (who also played for Pakistan at the Helsinki Olympiad in 1952) and Akhtar Hussain had represented the gold medal winning India men's hockey team in the 1948 Olympic Games in London, before migrating to Pakistan

Shooting

Two shooters represented Pakistan in 1956.

25 m pistol
 Zafar Ahmed Muhammad
 67/74/83/81/76/79 = Score 460. Finished 31st out of 33

300 m rifle, three positions
 Saifi Chaudhry
 (84/-/-/-) (withdrew) (12/65/59/47) = Score 267. Finished 20th out of 20

50 m rifle, three positions
 Zafar Ahmed Muhammad
 389/353/257 = Score 999. Finished 43rd out of 44

50 m rifle, prone
 Zafar Ahmed Muhammad
 98/99/96/97/96/96 = Score 582. Finished 44th out of 44

Swimming

Men's 100 metres backstroke

 Nazir Ahmed
 Heat 1 1st round; 1:10.7 (→ did not advance)

Men's 200 metres breaststroke

 Ghulam Rasul
 Heat 3 1st round; Disqualified

Men's 200 metres butterfly stroke

 Ghazi Shah
 Heat 3 1st round; 2:48.0 (→ did not advance)

Weightlifting

Men's bantamweight (up to 56 kg)

 Habibur Rehman
 Press 80kg
 Snatch x
 Jerk 97.5kg
 Total not calculated (finished 15th out of 16)

Men's featherweight (up to 60 kg)

 Mohammad Bashir
 Press 72.5kg
 Snatch 77.5kg
 Jerk 97.5kg
 Total 247.5kg (finished 18th out of 21)

Men's light heavyweight (up to 82.5 kg)

 Mohammad Iqbal Butt
 Press 105kg
 Snatch 102.5kg
 Jerk 130kg
 Total 337.5kg (finished 10th out of 10)

Wrestling

Men's flyweight (up to 52 kg)

 Abdul Aziz
 1st round; Lost to JK Lee (KOR) by fall
 2nd round; Beat F Flannery (AUS) on pts 3:0
 3rd round; Lost to H Akbas (TUR) by fall

Men's bantamweight (up to 57 kg)

 Zahur Din
 1st round; Beat G Jameson (AUS) on pts 3:0
 2nd round; Lost to SK Lee (KOR) on pts 2:1
 3rd round; Lost to M Chakhov (USSR) by fall

Men's featherweight (up to 62 kg)

 Mohammad Nazir
 1st round; Lost to S Sasahara (JPN) on pts 3:0
 2nd round; Lost to B Sit (TUR) on pts 2:1

Men's lightweight (up to 67 kg)

 Mohammad Ashraf
 1st round; Beat TK Oh (KOR) by fall
 2nd round; Lost to M Tovar Gonzalez (MEX) on pts 2:1
 3rd round; Beat J Taylor (GB/NI) on pts 3:0
 4th round; Lost to A Bestaev (USSR) by fall

Men's welterweight (up to 73 kg)

 Mohammad Latif
 1st round; Lost to A Tischendorf (GER) on pts 3:0
 2nd round; Bye
 3rd round; Lost to CW de Villiers (SAF) on pts 3:0

Men's middleweight (up to 79 kg)

 Mohammad Faiz
 1st round; Lost to VM Punkari (FIN) by fall
 2nd round; Lost to I Atli (TUR) by fall

Mohammad Faiz, who took part in the 1956 Olympics at Melbourne, was not the same person as wrestler Faiz Mohammad who participated in two Olympic Games—at Rome 1960 and Tokyo 1964—also in the middleweight category

References

External links
Official Olympic Reports
International Olympic Committee results database

Nations at the 1956 Summer Olympics
1956 Summer Olympics
1956 in Pakistani sport